Regintrud, also known as Reginlind and Regentrud, (born 660–665, died 730–740) was probably the wife of Duke Theodbert of Bavaria or of his father Duke Theodo of Bavaria. A possibly identical Regintrud became abbess of Nonnberg Abbey in 720–725. However, details about her ancestry and life are widely disputed among historians.

According to differing views, Regintrud was either a daughter of King Dagobert I, or of Pfalzgraf Hugobert and Irmina of Oeren, or of Childebert III.

Issue 
Assuming she was married with Theudebert of Bavaria, her children from this marriage were:
Hugbert of Bavaria, heir to the duchy
Guntrud, wife of Liutprand

Historians researched inconclusive evidence about further children, such as a daughter named Pilitrud from a previous marriage with an unknown husband. Tassilo II and Swanachild are also suggested as children from her marriage with Theudebert.

References 

660s births
Year of death uncertain
8th-century Frankish nobility
8th-century Frankish women
7th-century Frankish nobility
7th-century Frankish women